The National Catholic Educational Association (NCEA) is a private, professional educational membership association of over 150,000 educators in Catholic schools, universities, and religious education programs. It is the largest such organization in the world.

History
NCEA traces its official beginning to a meeting held in St. Louis, Missouri, July 12–14, 1904. At that meeting the separate Catholic education organizations, the Education Conference of Catholic Seminary Faculties (1898), the Association of Catholic Colleges (1899) and the Parish School Conference (1902) agreed to unite as the Catholic Educational Association (CEA).

From then until 1919, the CEA was the only unifying agent for Catholic education at the national level. In 1919, the establishment of the National Catholic War Council (NCWC), later changed to National Catholic Welfare Council, to serve as an agency of the American bishops to coordinate all Catholic activity, including education, marked a new era for CEA. A working relationship of independent cooperation between the Association and the Department of Education of NCWC was established that endures with the NCW successor, the United States Catholic Conference (USCCB).

In 1927, the word ‘national’ was added to the official CEA title and, in 1929, the association headquarters moved to Washington, DC to be in proximity to other national secular agencies of education. The Association began a policy of friendly cooperation with other private and public educational associations and federal government agencies in the service of all aspects of American education.

In 1931 the Library Section which had existed from 1922 chaired by Reverend Paul J. Foik, C.S.C. became an independent association, the Catholic Library Association. 

In 2016, the NCEA discontinued its departments for seminaries and parish religious education departments, instead focusing on K-12 Catholic organizations in the United States.

At present, NCEA focuses on: leadership development for superintendents, presidents, principals, pastors, and governing bodies; professional development for teachers; and serving as the voice for Catholic school education.

ACCU and NCEA
The Association of Catholic Colleges and Universities, founded independently in 1899, has a long relationship with the various components that later became the National Catholic Educational Association, of which it has for some time been a constitutive member. As of July 1, 2000, ACCU is an independently incorporated 501(c3) organization and an Affiliate of the NCEA.

NCEA is a voluntary association of educators and institutions. The Association's organizational structure changed from a departmental arrangement to a functional arrangement.  Previously, member institutions held association membership through one of the constitutive departments.  In 2016 the organization was restructured eliminating the seminary and religious education departments, focusing instead on the three pillars of Lead. Learn, Proclaim. Lead is the development of leadership skills of members. Learn is the seminar and conference approach to enhancing learning of members. Proclaim is the Organization's position to being a national voice for Catholic Education in the US.

While the USCCB remains the authority for the Catholic Church in the US, NCEA develops and articulates a national point of view that is consistent with the USCCB.

NCEA is the largest private professional education organization in the world, representing 150,000 Catholic educators serving 1.9 million students in Catholic education.

Symbolism of the official NCEA logo
NCEA and its membership: working together to promote our Catholic faith and lighting the way for the future of Catholic education. Together, NCEA and its members share light and life with each other (two candles) and bring the light of faith (cross) and knowledge (light and bookends) to students. Green represents growth and renewal. It symbolizes the promise of new life as well as learning, growth and harmony. Blue is embraced as the color of heaven and authority, strength, trust and dependability.

Governance 
NCEA has a board of directors which has from 15 to 18 members, including three ex-officio members.  The chair of the board shall be US Bishop of the Roman Catholic Church.  The current and past chairs are as follows:

 Bishop Gerald F. Kicanas (Diocese of Tucson, 2017 - current) 
 Bishop George V. Murry, S.J. (Diocese of Youngstown, 2015 - 2017)
 Cardinal Blase J. Cupich, (Archdiocese of Chicago, 2013-2015)
 Archbishop Wilton Daniel Gregory (Archdiocese of Atlanta, 2007-2013)
 Cardinal Donald Wuerl (Archdiocese of Washington, 2005-2007)

Membership

Meetings
An annual convention features prominent educators in sessions and showcases the latest in technology, publications and services along with a major exposition. Various other conferences, seminars, workshops and symposiums are held throughout the year with each one with its own specific focus.

Services
  In-service programs 
  Religious education assessments: ACRE for children and IFG for adults 
  Development field services 
  National conference 
  Award programs recognizing outstanding educators and students

Conventions 

 2020 - Baltimore (April 13–15), Cancelled due to the COVID19 pandemic
 2019 - Chicago (April 23–25)
 2018 - Cincinnati 
 2017 - St. Louis
 2016 - San Diego
 2015 - Orlando
2014 - Pittsburg
2013 - Houston
2012 - Boston
2011 - New Orleans
2010 - Minneapolis
2009 - Los Angeles

Publications
Momentum – Each issue is built around a special section highlighting an area of particular interest to Catholic educators. Momentum also includes editorials, pertinent book reviews, ads of interest to educators, short essays based on personal experiences, and columns.

Press releases may be found here, and include upcoming events.

Awards given by the NCEA
C. Albert Koob, O.Praem Award

The C. Albert Koob Merit Award is given to an individual or organization that has made a significant contribution to Catholic education at any level – early childhood, elementary, secondary, higher education – or in any educational setting, in one or more of these areas: teaching, administration, parish religious education, research, publication or educational leadership. Such service or contribution has current significance at the national level. The award is given at the annual NCEA convention during Easter Week.

 2018 - Dr. Merylann "Mimi" Schuttloffel (The Catholic University of America)

John F. Meyers Award

The John F. Meyers Award is presented to "someone who has provided substantial support for Catholic education" in any of the above-mentioned ways or through such contributions as development, public relations, scholarship programs, financial management, or government relations. This award, too, recognizes national impact. The award is given at the annual NCEA convention during Easter Week.

 2018 - Steven Virgadamo (Archdiocese of New York)

Catherine T. McNamee, CSJ Award

The Catherine T. McNamee, CSJ Award is presented to an individual or school for leadership in promoting a vision of Catholic education that welcomes and serves cultural and economic diversity or serving students with diverse needs. The award is given at the annual NCEA convention during Easter Week.

 2018 - Mayra Alza Wilson (Archdiocese of Cincinnati)

Leonard F. DeFiore Parental Choice Advocate Award

The Leonard F. DeFiore Parental Choice Advocate Award is presented to an individual who has demonstrated outstanding leadership in promoting full and fair parental choice in education. The award is given at the annual NCEA convention during Easter Week.

 2018 - John Elcesser (Inidiana Non-Public Education Association)

Dr. Karen M. Ristau Innovations Award

The Dr. Karen M. Ristau Innovation Award is presented to an individual, school or program that has furthered the mission of Catholic Education through an innovative program or approach.

 2018 - The Academy of Catholic Educators (Notre Dame of Maryland University)

St. Elizabeth Ann Seton Awards

NCEA's St. Elizabeth Ann Seton Awards were created to honor those individuals whose personal or professional philanthropy or volunteer service has impacted Catholic education in particular or U.S. education and our country's youth in general. Named after Saint Elizabeth Ann Seton in recognition of her lifelong dedication to teaching, those receiving Seton Awards have a $1,000 scholarship presented in their honor to a deserving Catholic school student from their community. The awards are given in early October in Washington, DC.

2017
The Most Reverend Robert J. Carlson (Archbishop of Saint Louis) 
Dennis J. Smith (Catholic Philanthropist - Manteno, IL)
 Joseph Weston (Weston Investment Company)
 Rita and Lamar Hunt Jr. (Loretto Companies)
2018
James and Molly Perry  (Madison Dearborn Partners)
Kevin Short (Clayton Capital Partners)
Archbishop Joseph E. Kurtz (Archdiocese of Louisville)
Porto Charities 
Women's Education Alliance (Townson Maryland)

Youth Virtues, Valor and Vision Awards

This award recognizes Catholic school students in elementary and secondary schools who through their selfless service, determination, innovation and ideals are changing the world. The honorees embody the standards of personal conduct and public service through their faith, leadership and service to others.

Lead. Learn. Proclaim. Awards

These awards recognize outstanding Catholic schools that honor the efforts and contributions that teachers, principals, pastors, administrators and school boards make to further Catholic education. The Lead. Learn. Proclaim. Awards are presented at a banquet at the annual NCEA Convention.

References

External links
National Catholic Educational Association website
President Delivers Remarks to Catholic Educational Association. The G.W. Bush White House web site. Press release, January 9, 2004.

1904 establishments in the United States
Organizations established in 1904
Private and independent school organizations in the United States
Educational organizations based in the United States
Catholic education